Marina Nadiradze (born 1978) is a Georgian pianist.

She studied at the State Conservatoire in Tbilisi. As a precocious nine-year-old she won the first of her international awards in Vilnius, Lithuania and since then has gone on to amass an impressive list of competition successes, including 2nd Prize in the inaugural Tbilisi International Piano Competition in 1997, 1st Prize in the highly prestigious LASMO Staffa Award in 2000, and 2nd Prize and the Lawrence Glover Silver Medal at the Scottish International Piano Competition in 2001.

Later she studied at the Royal Scottish Academy of Music and Drama in Glasgow, Scotland.

Now based in Scotland, she performs solo works in concerts throughout Europe. Recently recorded live at recitals in Glasgow and at the Musique-Cordiale Festival in Seillans, France. She is acclaimed for her playing of romantic pieces, notably by Schubert, Ravel, Scarlatti, Scriabin, Schumann, Chopin and the Georgian composer Revaz Lagidze. She played the piano sequences for the successful movie Ae Fond Kiss....

External links
Marina Nadiradze at Musique-Cordiale
Michael Church on Wigmore Hall debut, The Independent, February 2007
Marina Nadiradze
Genealogy on Pianists Corner
Playlist on Pianists Corner

1978 births
Living people
Classical pianists from Georgia (country)
Women pianists from Georgia (country)
Women classical pianists
Alumni of the Royal Conservatoire of Scotland
Scottish pianists
Scottish women pianists
Georgian emigrants to Scotland
Date of birth missing (living people)
Place of birth missing (living people)
21st-century classical pianists
21st-century women pianists